Leif Johan Borgert, (born 8 July 1978 in Säffle) is a Swedish singer and performer.

Discography
Album
Johan Borgert (2003)
Johan Borgert & Holy Madre (2004)
Holy Madre (2006)
Nu är jag ett as (2010)
 Singles
"Skott i hjärtat" (som sångare i Scott) (1997)
"Fabriksslavarna" (2002)
"Smal" (2003)
"Jag tror jag heter Daniel ikväll" (2004)
"Du ville betyda något för någon" (2005)
"Hot om sex" (2010)
"Smalfilm" (2010)

References

Living people
1978 births
Swedish male singers